Phyllocnistis argentella is a moth of the family Gracillariidae, known from Rennell Island in the Solomon Islands. It was described by J.D. Bradley in 1957, originally under the genus Opostega.

References

Phyllocnistis
Endemic fauna of the Solomon Islands